Pluto is a genus of aphid wasps in the family Crabronidae. There are at least 50 described species in Pluto.

Species
These 58 species belong to the genus Pluto:

 Pluto abbreviatus van Lith, 1979 i c g
 Pluto aerofacies (Malloch, 1933) i c g
 Pluto albifacies (Malloch, 1933) i c g
 Pluto alphitopus van Lith, 1979 i c g
 Pluto angulicornis (Malloch, 1933) i c g
 Pluto annulipes (Cameron, 1891) i c g
 Pluto araguensis van Lith, 1979 i c g
 Pluto arenivagus Krombein, 1950 i c g
 Pluto argentifrons (Cresson, 1865) i c g
 Pluto atricornis (Malloch, 1933) i c g
 Pluto basifuscus van Lith, 1979 i c g
 Pluto biformis van Lith, 1979 i c g
 Pluto brevipetiolatus (Rohwer, 1910) i c g
 Pluto castaneipes van Lith, 1979 i c g
 Pluto clavicornis (Malloch, 1933) i c g
 Pluto colonensis van Lith, 1979 i c g
 Pluto denticollis van Lith, 1979 i c g
 Pluto depressus van Lith, 1979 i c g
 Pluto duckei van Lith, 1979 i c g
 Pluto emarginatus van Lith, 1979 i c g
 Pluto evansi van Lith, 1979 i c g
 Pluto facialis van Lith, 1979 i c g
 Pluto fritzi van Lith, 1979 i c g
 Pluto incarinatus van Lith, 1979 i c g
 Pluto joergenseni (Brèthes, 1913) i c g
 Pluto jugularis van Lith, 1979 i c g
 Pluto littoralis (Malloch, 1933) i c g
 Pluto longiventris (Malloch, 1933) i c g
 Pluto marthae van Lith, 1979 i c g
 Pluto medius (F. Smith, 1856) i c g
 Pluto menkei van Lith, 1979 i c g
 Pluto metanus van Lith, 1979 i c g
 Pluto minutus (Malloch, 1933) i c g
 Pluto nitens van Lith, 1979 i c g
 Pluto obscurus van Lith, 1979 i c g
 Pluto occipitalis van Lith, 1979 i c g
 Pluto pallidistigma (Malloch, 1933) i c g
 Pluto punctatellus van Lith, 1979 i c g
 Pluto pygmaeus (Brèthes, 1913) i c g
 Pluto rotundus van Lith, 1979 i c g
 Pluto rufanalis van Lith, 1979 i c g
 Pluto rufibasis (Malloch, 1933) i c g
 Pluto rugulosus van Lith, 1979 i c g
 Pluto sayi (Rohwer, 1910) i c g
 Pluto scytinus van Lith, 1979 i c g
 Pluto simplicicollis van Lith, 1979 i c g
 Pluto smithii (W. Fox, 1897) i c g
 Pluto spangleri van Lith, 1979 i c g
 Pluto spinicollis van Lith, 1979 i c g
 Pluto stenopygidialis van Lith, 1979 i c g
 Pluto stramineipes van Lith, 1979 i c g
 Pluto strigellus van Lith, 1979 i c g
 Pluto suffusus (W. Fox, 1898) i c g
 Pluto texanus (Malloch, 1933) i c g
 Pluto tibialis (Cresson, 1873) i c g
 Pluto townsendi (Cockerell, 1911) i c g
 Pluto trilobatus van Lith, 1979 i c g
 Pluto zonatus van Lith, 1979 i c g

Data sources: i = ITIS, c = Catalogue of Life, g = GBIF,

References

Further reading

 
 

Crabronidae